Vincent Czyz  (/ˈtʃɛz/ Chez; born 1963)  is an American writer and critic of Literary fiction. His work often explores mythological motifs, religious themes, and dreams as a substrate of reality.

Biography 
Vincent Czyz was born in Orange, New Jersey and raised in nearby East Orange. He graduated in 1981 as the salutatorian of his class at Lakeland Regional High School.

He received a B.A. from the Rutgers University in New Brunswick, New Jersey, an M.A. from Columbia University, and an M.F.A. from Rutgers-Newark. He lived in Istanbul, Turkey for seven years, teaching English at several Turkish universities. He also taught creative writing at The College of New Jersey. He lives in Jersey City, New Jersey with his wife, Neslihan, and their son, Rainier. His older brother is former American boxer, light-heavyweight champion Bobby Czyz.

Writing 
Czyz is the author of an acclaimed short story collection, two novels, and the latest, a collection of essays. His short stories and essays have appeared in numerous journals, magazines, and several anthologies, including, the New England Review, Shenandoah, AGNI, The Massachusetts Review, Georgetown Review, Tin House, The Arts Fuse, Tampa Review, Boston Review, Copper Nickel, Southern Indiana Review, Skidrow Penthouse, and a contribution in the festschrift collection Stories for Chip (2015). In his prefatory note to Adrift in a Vanishing City, Samuel R. Delany characterizes Czyz’s short story collection as, "a small landmark in the sedimentation of new form in fiction". Czyz estimates that he did 7,000 pages of research for his novel, The Christos Mosaic, which, according to American New Testament scholar Robert M. Price, included “genuine, radical biblical scholarship in a beautifully rendered adventure full of unforgettable characters, set in exotic locales vividly and poetically described”.

Awards 
He is the recipient of the 1994 William Faulkner Wisdom Prize for Short Fiction, two fellowships from the NJ Council on the Arts
In 2011 he was awarded Truman Capote Fellowship at Rutgers University.
Eric Hoffer Award for Best in Small Press, 2016.

Bibliography

Novels and collections
Adrift In A Vanishing City a collection of interlinked avant-garde stories was published May 10, 2015; having first been released in 1998.

The Christos Mosaic (Blank Slate Press, 2015).

The Three Veils Of Ibn Oraybi: a novella; published July 10, 2021. Of which critic Diane Donovan of the Midwest Book Review stated,“Czyz weaves mystery, history, religious fervor, and social inspection into this story of struggle... Its lovely, lyrical language and thought-provoking encounters... explore the politics and psychological profiles of cultures that lived side by side...".

The Secret Adventures of Order (2022): a collection of literary essays, creative nonfiction, and biblical exegesis.

References

External links

1963 births
Living people
20th-century American novelists
21st-century American novelists
American male novelists
Lakeland Regional High School alumni
Postmodernists
Rutgers University–Newark alumni
Rutgers University alumni
Columbia University alumni
Novelists from New Jersey
People from East Orange, New Jersey
People from Jersey City, New Jersey
People from Orange, New Jersey
20th-century American poets
21st-century American poets
American male poets
20th-century American male writers
21st-century American male writers
21st-century American non-fiction writers
American male non-fiction writers
American speculative fiction critics